"100%" is a song by American rock band Sonic Youth from their seventh studio album Dirty (1992). It was released as the lead single from the album in July 1992, by DGC. Written by Sonic Youth, the song discusses the murder of Joe Cole, a friend of the band who was killed in an armed robbery on December 19, 1991.

Recording
The song was recorded and produced in early 1992 at Magic Shop in New York City by Butch Vig and Sonic Youth. Vig also engineered the song, with assistance from Edward Douglas.

Critical reception
Greg Kot of the Chicago Tribune praised the song's "garage-rock power chords", in addition to designating it as "a great single". Dele Fadele of NME said the song "sets the tone perfectly for Dirtys loving seedy, political and romantic take on classic rock n roll - an Exile On Main Street for the '90s". Scott Hreha of Pitchfork spoke positively of the confrontational lyrical content of "100%", describing the song, alongside "JC", as "elegiac tributes to murdered friends". Uncut praised the radio-friendly nature of the song, referring to it as "contagious grunge-pop".

Chart performance
In the United States, "100%” debuted at number 22 on the Alternative Airplay chart for the issue dated July 18, 1992. Within five weeks, the song reached its peak position of number four, becoming Sonic Youth's highest charting song on the chart. The song spent a total of 13 weeks on the chart.

Music video
The music video for "100%" was directed by Tamra Davis and Spike Jonze, and shot in Los Angeles. Much of the video footage was shot by Jonze while riding on a skateboard, following others in the streets (including then-skateboarder, now-actor Jason Lee). The video also alluded to the shooting death of Cole, but is not specifically about him, and more about friendship between two skateboarders. Sonic Youth is shown playing a house party throughout the film. Kim Gordon plays a yellow Fender bass guitar, which she borrowed from actor Keanu Reeves.Archived at Ghostarchive and the Wayback Machine: 

Ban
In the music video, Kim Gordon dons a counterfeit The Rolling Stones T-shirt with the phrase “Eat me” written across the front. This phrase was deemed as too obscene for MTV, resulting in the video being banned from the network. Gordon responded to the banning: “It's a bootleg Rolling Stones shirt — the big mouth — and it said 'Eat me' on it. At the time, I just took it, like, ‘Well, that's confusing’, because they've obviously got, like, mostly naked women in their videos”.

Live performances
On September 4, 1992, Sonic Youth performed the song on Late Night with David Letterman.

Cover versions
“100%” was covered by Mantar on their fourth studio album, Grungetown Hooligans II (2020). Matthis Van Der Meulen directed an accompanying music video, which acts as an homage to the original music video released by Sonic Youth.

Track listings and formats
 12" and 10" vinyl, cassette, and CD single "100%" (LP version) – 2:28
 "Crème Brûlée" (LP version) – 2:33
 "Genetic"  – 3:34
 "Hendrix Necro"  – 2:49
 7" vinyl'
 "100%" (LP Version) – 2:28
 "Crème Brûlée" (LP version) – 2:33

Charts

References

Sonic Youth songs
1992 singles
Music videos directed by Spike Jonze
Music videos directed by Tamra Davis
Song recordings produced by Butch Vig
1992 songs